The 2012–13 VfB Stuttgart season was the 120th season in the club's football history. In 2012–13, the club contested the Bundesliga, the top tier of German football. It was Stuttgart's 36th consecutive season in the league, since having been promoted from the 2. Bundesliga in 1977.

Review and events
The club finished in sixth place in the 2011–12 season. Therefore, the club participates in the 2012–13 edition of the UEFA Europa League, and also participates in the 2012–13 edition of the DFB-Pokal.

Match results

Legend

Bundesliga

League fixtures and results

Table

League table

Summary table

DFB-Pokal

UEFA Europa League

Play-off round

Group stage

Group E fixtures and results

Group E table

Final Group E table

Group E summary table

Knockout phase

Round of 32

Round of 16

Notes

Note: The Lazio v Stuttgart match was played behind closed doors due to the punishment handed to Lazio by UEFA following incidents at their round of 32 match second leg against Borussia Mönchengladbach on 21 February 2013.

Overall record

Squad

Appearances and goals

|-
! colspan="12" style="background:#dcdcdc; text-align:center;"| Goalkeepers

|-
! colspan="12" style="background:#dcdcdc; text-align:center;"| Defenders

|-
! colspan="12" style="background:#dcdcdc; text-align:center;"| Midfielders

|-
! colspan="12" style="background:#dcdcdc; text-align:center;"| Strikers

|}

Transfers

In

Out

Loan in

Kits

VfB Stuttgart II

The 2012–13 VfB Stuttgart II season pertains to the reserve team for VfB Stuttgart. The season began on 21 July 2012 and ended on 18 May 2013. They are participating in the 3. Liga.

References

External links
 2012–13 VfB Stuttgart season at Weltfussball.de 
 2012–13 VfB Stuttgart season at kicker.de 
 2012–13 VfB Stuttgart season at Fussballdaten.de 

Stuttgart
VfB Stuttgart seasons
Stuttgart